The Secretariat of Security and Civilian Protection ( or SSPC) is a cabinet-level agency of the government of Mexico responsible for supervising public safety and security, including the National Guard, National Intelligence Center and the penitentiary system. Its secretary was Alfonso Durazo until October 2020 when he resigned to run for governor of Sonora.

History

The SSPC was created in 2018 by way of the omnibus reform package to the Organic Law of the Federal Public Administration for the presidency of Andrés Manuel López Obrador. It absorbed all of the security apparatus housed in the Secretariat of the Interior (SEGOB), including the National Security Commission (CNS). These functions had been in SEGOB since the Secretariat of Public Security was dissolved at the start of 2013.

Among the tasks to be undertaken by the new SSPC are the formation of a new National Guard, which will absorb the 35,000 members of the military police and another 8,000 from the naval police.

References

Security